CW 5 or CW5 may 
refer to:

Television
"CW 5" may refer to the following stations that were currently affiliated and were former affiliates with the new "fifth" network merged from The WB and UPN, The CW:

Current
KALB-DT3, a digital channel of KALB-TV in Alexandria, Louisiana
KCWQ-LD in Palm Springs, California (cable channel; broadcasts on channel 2.1)
KESQ-TV in Palm Springs, California (translator of KCWQ-LD; broadcasts on channel 2.3)
KGWN-DT3, a digital channel of KGWN-TV in Cheyenne, Wyoming
KNHL in Hastings, Nebraska
KTLA in Los Angeles, California
WABI-DT2, a digital channel of WABI-TV in Bangor, Maine
WBKP in Calumet, Michigan
WCYB-DT2, a digital channel of WCYB-TV in Bristol, Virginia
WLAJ-DT2 in Lansing/Jackson, Michigan (cable channel; broadcasts on channel 53.2)

Former
KSWB-TV in San Diego, California (affiliated with CW from 2006 to 2008; was cable channel of over-the-air broadcast on channel 69)
WPTZ-DT2, a digital channel of WPTZ in Plattsburgh, New York (affiliated with CW from 2013 to 2018)

Other uses
Chief Warrant Officer 5
CW5, a United Kingdom postcode district in the CW postcode area, assigned to Cheshire along with small parts of Staffordshire and Shropshire
 CW5 (tram), a class of electric trams built by the Melbourne & Metropolitan Tramways Board